Oraovica is a village in the municipality of Radoviš, North Macedonia. It is the largest village according to population in the municipality.

Demographics
According to the 2002 census, the village had a total of 1,720 inhabitants. Ethnic groups in the village include:

Macedonians 1,701
Turks 12
Serbs 3
Romani 2
Others 2

References

Church 
 Sv. Atanasij

Villages in Radoviš Municipality